Henry "Harry" Crapp, commonly known as "Ivo" Crapp (1872 – 21 January 1924) was a leading Australian rules football field umpire in the Victorian Football League (VFL) at its formation in the 1890s, and with the West Australian Football League in the early 1900s.

Known as the VFL's "Prince of Umpires" — "in the capacity of central umpire he attained a degree of skill which stamped him as a prodigy, and one who was without peer in the history of the Australian game" — he umpired the first ever match in that league.

Early life
The son of Henry Crapp, and Emma Crapp (née Snell), Henry "Harry" Crapp was born in Victoria in 1872. He married Priscilla "Prissie" Hulley (1875–1949) in 1895. They had three children, Edward, Thomas, and May (later, Mrs. D.N. Clair).

"Ivo", not "Ivor"
Harry's brother, William Henry Crapp (1865–1946), was known as "Ivo", due to his close facial resemblance to Ivo Bligh, 8th Earl of Darnley who had visited Australia in 1882/1883 as the captain of the first-ever English cricket team to play an Ashes series in Australia. Once William retired from football, Harry became known far and wide as "Ivo", inheriting his brother's nickname.

Playing career 
Crapp played just four games for Carlton in the VFA during the 1893 season before taking up umpiring. His older brother, William, who played at full-back and "was a beautiful kick for goal", also played with Carlton in the VFA at the same time.

Umpiring career

VFA/VFL 
Crapp started his umpiring career in the Victorian Football Association in 1895.

When the newly formed Victorian Football League commenced in 1897, he was appointed to the first match at Corio Oval between Geelong and Essendon. He was also the field umpire in the VFL's first-ever Grand Final, between Fitzroy and Essendon, on 24 September 1898.

Crapp was well regarded by the footballers; no doubt his height, at 6"1', also gave him some authority. He was considered to be a very competent umpire, and well able to discern a "stage" for a free kick. He was also proud of the (then unusual) ability to refer to all players by their names during the course of a match. In 1901, Crapp began the practice of calling the reasons for free kicks and nominating who was to take the kick by name. This innovation was soon generally adopted by all of the umpires.

Crapp umpired at a time when the field umpire had to not only control the field play, but also return the ball into play once out of bounds (boundary umpires commenced in 1904 ). Furthermore, until 1922, the field umpire also had to return the ball to the centre following the scoring of a goal. Luckily, the overall pace of games was much slower than in the more modern eras, and Crapp maintained a relatively high standard of fitness.

By 1905, his record stood at 198 matches – 147 of them in the VFL – including 17 finals and 7 Grand Finals (1898–1902 and 1904–05). In addition he umpired interstate matches in 1899, 1902 and 1905.

WAFL 
In 1906, Crapp was enticed to move to Kalgoorlie, Western Australia on the promise of employment and a contract from the Goldfields Football Association. Crapp found that no job existed for him, the proposed employment having fallen through, and departed by train to Perth, intending to return to Melbourne.

WAFL officials, however, managed to intercept Crapp and convince him to umpire the first round in their Perth-based competition. The League quickly offered him a contract having seen the quality of his umpiring. He was as outstanding in the WAFL as he had been in the VFL, and he was appointed to the 1906 finals series and the Grand Final. He became the first-choice umpire in the WAFL and he umpired every final until 1914 – a total of 30 in all. Crapp also umpired four West Australian State Premiership matches; in 1906, 1909 and 1913.

Although some assert that Crapp coached East Perth in 1909, it seems unlikely. Records indicate that he also umpired every week that season, including a final in which East Perth played; and, so perhaps he may have been active in some other capacity with the club, given that Ben Wallish, the team's captain, was also their coach.

Note that, although the Subiaco Football Club's "Honour Roll" clearly states that its 1910 captain-coach was Jack Diprose, an April 1910 press report states that "Ivor Crapp is coaching the Subiaco 18 this season"; and so it may be that Crapp, from time to time, took on various advisory duties with various WAFL teams.

In 1914, he travelled to Sydney as the Western Australian representative umpire at the Australian National Football Council Carnival.

In the WAFL, Crapp umpired 177 games before his retirement in 1919, for a career total of 352 games. His last major appointment (by request of the VFL) was to the 1921 interstate match between Western Australia and Victoria – at the astonishing age of 48.

Death
He died at his home in West Perth, Western Australia on 21 January 1924.

Honours 
Inducted into the Australian Football Hall of Fame in 1996, his citation read:
The VFL's first 'Prince of Umpires'. Moving from the VFA to the newly formed VFL, he officiated in round one, 1897, and retired in 1905 after 147 matches including seven Grand Finals. Moved to Western Australia where he coached East Perth in 1909 then returned to umpiring, adding 120 games and three WAFL grand finals to his senior total before retiring in 1920.

Footnotes

References
 Grand Final Umpires: VFL/AFL 1897-2016, AFL Umpires Association 2016 Yearbook, AFL Umpires Association, (Docklands), 2016, pp.52-53.
 de Lacy, H.A., "Crapp: Genius as Umpire, says Veteran Bert Howson", The Sporting Globe, (Saturday, 31 May 1941), p.6.
 McGregor, R., Rod McGregor says Players called Umpire Ivo Crapp The Boss, The Sporting Globe, (Saturday, 29 August 1936), p.8.
 "Dookie" McKenzie, "An Umpire who tore up the rule book", The Sporting Globe, (Wednesday, 18 September 1935), p.9.
 Ross, J. (ed), 100 Years of Australian Football 1897–1996: The Complete Story of the AFL, All the Big Stories, All the Great Pictures, All the Champions, Every AFL Season Reported, Viking, (Ringwood), 1996. 

 The Winners of the Ladies Fancy Dress Football Match Played on the Subiaco Oval on Saturday Last, The Western Mail, (Friday, 5 October 1917), p.21.

External links
 Ivo Crapp, australianfootball.com.
 Australian Football Hall of Fame
 AFL Umpires Assoc

1872 births
1924 deaths
Australian Football Hall of Fame inductees
Australian Football League umpires
West Australian Football Hall of Fame inductees
West Australian Football League umpires
Victorian Football Association umpires
Carlton Football Club (VFA) players
East Perth Football Club coaches
Australian rules footballers from Melbourne